In geometry, geometrization theorem may refer to 
Thurstons's hyperbolization theorem for Haken 3-manifolds
Thurston's geometrization conjecture proved by Perelman, a generalization of the hyperbolization theorem to all compact 3-manifolds.